USS Frank Knox (DD-742) was a Gearing-class destroyer which served in the United States Navy from 1944 to 1971. She was then transferred to the Greek Navy and renamed Themistoklis (D-210). The ship was decommissioned in 1992 and finally sunk as a target in 2001.

History

1944-1971
Frank Knox was built at Bath, Maine and was named after Secretary of the Navy Frank Knox. Commissioned in December 1944, she arrived in the western Pacific war zone in mid-June 1945, in time to participate in the final carrier air raids on the Japanese home islands as part of Task Force 38. During the Battle of Okinawa she acted as a radar picket destroyer giving early warnings of incoming air raids. She was present in Tokyo Bay when Japan formally surrendered on 2 September 1945 and remained in the Far East until early February 1946. The ship made additional deployments to the region during the later 1940s and was reclassified as a radar picket destroyer DDR-742, in March 1949.

Frank Knox again steamed across the Pacific to take part in hostilities in early July 1950, shortly after the outbreak of the Korean War. During this combat tour, which lasted into 1951, her missions included support of the Inchon invasion, shelling enemy targets ashore and patrolling the Taiwan Straits. Two more Korean War cruises followed in 1952 and 1953, and for the rest of the decade Frank Knox deployed regularly to WestPac for Seventh Fleet service.

In 1960–1961 Frank Knox was modernized under the FRAM II program, which gave her updated radars and other new equipment. She was based in the Far East from late 1961 until mid-1964, then returned home via Australia and the south Pacific. Again deployed in June 1965, she briefly served off Vietnam conducting naval gunfire support and coastal patrol operations. Via Tsoying Naval Base, Taiwan while underway in the South China Sea on 18 July, Frank Knox ran aground on Pratas Reef, and was only freed after a very difficult salvage effort. Though she was badly damaged, and relatively elderly, her command and control capabilities justified an extensive repair job, which was carried out at Yokosuka, Japan, over the next year.

Frank Knox rejoined the active forces in November 1966 and resumed her pattern of nearly all annual Seventh Fleet cruises, frequently taking part in Vietnam combat missions. Redesignated DD-742 at the beginning of 1969, she completed her final deployment in November 1970 and was decommissioned at the end of January 1971.

Greek service

USS Frank Knox was transferred to the Greek Navy a few days later. Renamed ''Themistoklis'' (D210) (from Themistocles Athenian statesman who persuaded Athens to build a navy and then led it to victory over the Persians), she served for another two decades before being placed out of commission in the early 1990s. The ship was sunk as a torpedo target by the Greek Submarine Nireus (S-111) on 12 September 2001.

References

External links 

       navsource.org: USS Frank Knox (DD-742)
Hellenic Navy page for Themistoklis (D-210)

Gearing-class destroyers of the United States Navy
Ships built in Bath, Maine
1944 ships
World War II destroyers of the United States
Cold War destroyers of the United States
Korean War destroyers of the United States
Vietnam War destroyers of the United States
Gearing-class destroyers of the Hellenic Navy
Ships sunk as targets
Shipwrecks in the Mediterranean Sea
Maritime incidents in 1965
Maritime incidents in 2001